German submarine U-612 was a Type VIIC U-boat built for Nazi Germany's Kriegsmarine for service during World War II. She was ordered on 15 August 1940 and laid down at Blohm & Voss, Hamburg, on 21 April 1941. She was launched on 9 January 1942 and commissioned 5 March 1942
Oberleutnant zur See Paul Siegmann was her first commanding officer. He was joined in May 1942 by Herbert Werner, author of the book Iron Coffins, as First Officer.

She was later salvaged and served as a training boat until the end of the war, when she was scuttled on 1 May 1945.

Design
German Type VIIC submarines were preceded by the shorter Type VIIB submarines. U-612 had a displacement of  when at the surface and  while submerged. She had two shafts and two  propellers.

U-612 was fitted with five  torpedo tubes (four fitted at the bow and one at the stern), fourteen torpedoes, one  SK C/35 naval gun, 220 rounds, and a  C/30 anti-aircraft gun. The boat had a complement of between forty-four and sixty.

Service history
After commissioning, U-612 was engaged in working up and sea trials in the eastern Baltic, assigned to 5th U-boat Flotilla and based at Königsberg. 
On 6 August 1942 she was at sea off Danzig when she was accidentally rammed by U-444. Werner describes the event in his book; he states neither boat was aware of the other and that the captain of U-444 was unaware he had struck U-612. He describes in detail the struggle to get out of the rapidly sinking U-boat, and the crew's rescue by two other U-boats, one of which he states was the hapless U-444 Two men died in the incident.

Siegman and his crew undertook to salvage U-612 and put her back into action; the hull was raised during August but found to be too water-damaged for them to continue. The U-boat was handed over to the dockyard at Danzig and Seigmann and his crew were reassigned to another boat, .

U-612 completed repairs the following year and was re-commissioned 31 May 1943. However she was deemed unsuitable as a "Front-boat" and was confined to training in the Baltic. 
On commissioning, under Oblt. T Petersen she joined 24 Flotilla, a training unit. In February 1944 she joined 31 Flotilla, another training unit, under the command of Oblt.z.S. HP Dick.

On 1 May 1945 she was caught at Warnemunde by the advancing Red Army and was scuttled to avoid seizure.

U-612 in film 
 Das Boot, German television series

References

Sources
 Clay Blair, Hitler's U-Boat War Vol I  (1996). 
Erich Gröner German Warships 1815-1945 Vol II (1990). Conway Maritime Press 
Paul Kemp : U-Boats Destroyed ( 1997) . 
Axel Neistle : German U-Boat Losses during World War II (1998).  
Herbert Werner Iron Coffins (1969) Cassel & Co.

Bibliography

External links

German Type VIIC submarines
World War II submarines of Germany
1942 ships
U-boats commissioned in 1942
Ships built in Hamburg
U-boats sunk in 1942
U-boats sunk in collisions
Maritime incidents in August 1942
Operation Regenbogen (U-boat)
Maritime incidents in May 1945